The 1965 Australian Championships was a tennis tournament that took place on outdoor Grass courts at the Kooyong Lawn Tennis Club, Melbourne, Australia from 22 January to 1 February. It was the 53rd edition of the Australian Championships (now known as the Australian Open), the 15th held in Melbourne, and the first Grand Slam tournament of the year. The singles titles were won by Australians Roy Emerson and Margaret Smith.

Champions

Men's singles

 Roy Emerson defeated  Fred Stolle  7–9, 2–6, 6–4, 7–5, 6–1

Women's singles

 Margaret Smith defeated  Maria Bueno  5–7, 6–4, 5–2 retired

Men's doubles
 John Newcombe /  Tony Roche defeated  Roy Emerson /  Fred Stolle 3–6, 4–6, 13–11, 6–3, 6–4

Women's doubles
 Margaret Smith /  Lesley Turner defeated  Robyn Ebbern /  Billie Jean Moffitt, 1–6, 6–2, 6–3

Mixed doubles
 Robyn Ebbern /  Owen Davidson and  Margaret Smith /  John Newcombe (final not played)

Notes

References

External links
 Australian Open official website

1965 in Australian tennis
1960s in Melbourne
1965
January 1965 sports events in Australia
February 1965 sports events in Australia
Sports competitions in Melbourne
Tennis in Victoria (Australia)